Sales is a municipality in the northern part of the state of São Paulo in Brazil. The population is 6,407 (2020 est.) in an area of 308.45 km². The elevation is 448 m.

References

External links
  Pagina Iniciativa Privada
  Pagina da IBrasil de PropagWeb
  [ Homepage of Sales]

Municipalities in São Paulo (state)